Three-body problem or The Three-Body Problem may refer to:

Science
Three-body problem, a problem in physics of computing the trajectory of three bodies interacting with one another
Euler's three-body problem, a variant of the three-body problem discussed by Leonhard Euler

Film
The Three-Body Problem (film), a postponed film adaptation of the novel The Three-Body Problem

Literature
Remembrance of Earth's Past, also known as The Three-Body Problem or Three-Body, a trilogy of novels by Liu Cixin starting with The Three-Body Problem
The Three-Body Problem (novel), a 2008 novel by Liu Cixin and the first book in the Remembrance of Earth's Past trilogy

Television 
The Three-Body Problem in Minecraft, a 2014 Chinese animated series adaptation of the novel The Three-Body Problem
The Three-Body Problem (animated TV series), a 2022 Chinese animated series adaptation of the novel The Dark Forest, the second book in the Remembrance of Earth's Past trilogy
Three-Body (TV series), a 2023 Chinese live-action series adaptation of the novel The Three-Body Problem
The Three-Body Problem (upcoming TV series), a live-action series adaptation of the novel The Three-Body Problem by Netflix

See also
Poincaré and the Three-Body Problem